The Royal Corps of Signals (often simply known as the Royal Signals – abbreviated to R SIGNALS or R SIGS) is one of the combat support arms of the British Army. Signals units are among the first into action, providing the battlefield communications and information systems essential to all operations. Royal Signals units provide the full telecommunications infrastructure for the Army wherever they operate in the world. The Corps has its own engineers, logistics experts and systems operators to run radio and area networks in the field. It is responsible for installing, maintaining and operating all types of telecommunications equipment and information systems, providing command support to commanders and their headquarters, and conducting electronic warfare against enemy communications.

History

Origins
In 1870, 'C' Telegraph Troop, Royal Engineers, was founded under Captain Montague Lambert. The Troop was the first formal professional body of signallers in the British Army and its duty was to provide communications for a field army by means of visual signalling, mounted orderlies and telegraph. By 1871, 'C' Troop had expanded in size from 2 officers and 133 other ranks to 5 officers and 245 other ranks. In 1879, 'C' Troop first saw action during the Anglo-Zulu War. On 1 May 1884, 'C' Troop was amalgamated with the 22nd and 34th Companies, Royal Engineers, to form the Telegraph Battalion Royal Engineers; 'C' Troop formed the 1st Division (Field Force, based at Aldershot) while the two Royal Engineers companies formed the 2nd Division (Postal and Telegraph, based in London). Signalling was the responsibility of the Telegraph Battalion until 1908, when the Royal Engineers Signal Service was formed. As such, it provided communications during the First World War. It was about this time that motorcycle despatch riders and wireless sets were introduced into service.

Royal Warrant
A Royal Warrant for the creation of a Corps of Signals was signed by the Secretary of State for War, Winston Churchill, on 28 June 1920. Six weeks later, King George V conferred the title Royal Corps of Signals.

Subsequent history
Before the Second World War, Royal Signals recruits were required to be at least 5 feet 2 inches tall. They initially enlisted for eight years with the colours and a further four years with the reserve. They trained at the Signal Training Centre at Catterick Camp and all personnel were taught to ride.

During the Second World War (1939–45), members of the Royal Corps of Signals served in every theatre of war. In one notable action, Corporal Thomas Waters of the 5th Parachute Brigade Signal Section was awarded the Military Medal for laying and maintaining the field telephone line under heavy enemy fire across the Caen Canal Bridge during the Allied invasion of Normandy in June 1944.

In the immediate post-war period, the Corps played a full and active part in numerous campaigns including Palestine, the Indonesia-Malaysia confrontation, Malaya and the Korean War. Until the end of the Cold War, the main body of the Corps was deployed with the British Army of the Rhine confronting Soviet Bloc forces, providing the British Forces' contribution to NATO with its communications infrastructure. Soldiers from the Royal Signals delivered communications in the Falklands War in 1982 and the first Gulf War in 1991.

In 1994, The Royal Corps of Signals moved its training regiments, 11th Signal Regiment (the Recruit Training Regiment) and 8th Signal Regiment (the Trade Training School), from Catterick Garrison to Blandford Camp.

In late 2012, 2nd (National Communications) Signal Brigade was disbanded. Soldiers from the Royal Corps of Signals saw extensive service during the eight years of the Iraq War before withdrawal of troops in 2011, and the 13 years of the War in Afghanistan before it ended in 2014.

Under Army 2020 Refine a number of changes planned for the Corps were made public in 2013-14. A presentation by the Master of Signals indicated that 16 Signal Regiment would shift from 11 Signal Brigade to 1 Signal Brigade and focus on supporting communications for logistic headquarters. Similarly, 32 and 39 Signal Regiments were planned to shift to 1 Signal Brigade. 15 Signal Regiment would no longer be focused on Information Systems but would support 12th Armoured Infantry Brigade, while 21 and 2 Signal Regiments were planned to support the 1st and second Strike Brigades respectively. Furthermore, a new regiment, 13th Signal Regiment, was planned to form up under 1st Intelligence, Surveillance and Reconnaissance Brigade and work with 14th Signal Regiment on cyber and electromagnetic activity.

In 2017 the Royal Signals Motorcycle Display Team, then in its 90th year, was disbanded; senior officers had complained that it "failed to reflect the modern-day cyber communication skills in which the Royal Signals are trained".

On 28 June 2020, the Royal Corps of Signals marked the 100th anniversary of its foundation. Constrained by COVID-19 rules, many Royal Signals 100 celebrations were organised online, including the #100for100 challenge that involved hundreds of members of the Corps running 100 km for the Royal Signals Charity. The Princess Royal, the Colonel-In-Chief of the Corps, delivered a video message of congratulations, and the Foreman of Signals Course students successfully took a photograph of the Royal Signals 100 badge in space, completing a challenge that was set for them.

Personnel

Training and trades

Royal Signals officers receive general military training at the Royal Military Academy Sandhurst, followed by specialist communications training at the Royal School of Signals, Blandford Camp, Dorset. Other ranks are trained both as field soldiers and tradesmen. Their basic military training is delivered at the Army Training Regiment at Winchester or Army Training Centre Pirbright before undergoing trade training at 11th (Royal School of Signals) Signal Regiment. There are currently six different trades available to other ranks, each of which is open to both men and women:

 Cyber Information Services Engineer: trained in programming, database, web and app development, data communications and computer networks
 Cyber Networks Engineer: trained in data communications, computer networks, military radio and trunk communications systems
 Cyber Infrastructure Engineer: trained in installing and repairing fibre optic and copper voice and data networks in both internal and external environments 
 Power Engineer: trained to prepare, engineer and maintain complex Power Distribution Systems worldwide
 Supply Chain Operative: trained in all aspects of logistics, including driving, warehouse management and accounting
 Electronic Warfare & Signals Intelligence Operative: trained to intercept voice and data communications, to provide tactical electro-magnetic, cyber and signals intelligence on the battlefield and close tactical support to and advice to bomb disposal units

On selection for promotion to Sergeant, soldiers may choose to volunteer for selection to a Supervisory roster. Currently there are 4 Supervisor roles:
Yeoman of Signals – trained in the planning and deployment and management of military tactical/strategic communications networks;
Yeoman of Signals (Electronic Warfare) – trained in the planning, deployment and management of military tactical/strategic electronic warfare assets;
Foreman of Signals – trained in the installation, maintenance, repair and interoperability of military tactical/strategic communications assets;
Foreman of Signals (Information Systems) – trained in the installation, maintenance, repair and interoperability of military tactical/strategic Information Systems

If a soldier chooses not to follow the Supervisor route, they will remain employed 'in trade' until promoted to Warrant Officer, where they will then be classed as on the Regimental Duty (RD) roster and will oversee the daily routine, and administration of a unit's personnel and equipment.

Museum
The Royal Signals Museum is based at Blandford Camp in Dorset.

Dress and ceremonial

Tactical Recognition flash
The Corps wears a blue and white tactical recognition flash. This is worn horizontally on the right arm with the blue half charging forward.

Cap badge
The flag and cap badge feature Mercury (Latin: Mercurius), the winged messenger of the gods, who is referred to by members of the corps as "Jimmy". The origins of this nickname are unclear. According to one explanation, the badge is referred to as "Jimmy" because the image of Mercury was based on the late mediaeval bronze statue by the Italian sculptor Giambologna, and shortening his name over time reduced it to "Jimmy". The most widely accepted origin is a Royal Signals boxer, Jimmy Emblen, who was the British Army Champion in 1924 and represented the Royal Corps of Signals from 1921 to 1924.

Lanyard
On No 2, No 4 and No 14 Dress, the Corps wears a dark blue lanyard on the right side signifying its early links with the Royal Engineers. The Airborne Signals Unit wears a drab green lanyard made from parachute cord.

Motto
The Corps motto is "certa cito", often translated from Latin as Swift and Sure .

Appointments
The Colonel in Chief is currently the Princess Royal.

Equipment

The Corps deploys and operates a broad range of specialist military and commercial off-the-shelf (COTS) communications systems. The main categories are as follows:
Satellite ground terminals
Terrestrial trunk radio systems
Combat net radio systems
Computer networks
Specialist military applications (computer programmes)

Units

Brigades

There are now two signal brigades:

 1st Signal Brigade: The Brigade Headquarters is co-located at Imjin Barracks, Innsworth, outside Gloucester, with HQ ARRC (NATO's Allied Rapid Reaction Corps).
 11th Signal Brigade: The Brigade Headquarters is in MoD Donnington, near Telford 11th Signal Brigade moved from 6th Division to 3rd Division in October 2020.

The structure of the Royal Signals changed under Army 2020. The listing below shows the present location of units and their future location.

Regular Army
1st Signal Regiment – Supporting 20th Armoured Infantry Brigade at Swinton Barracks.
200 Signal Squadron
246 (Gurkha) Signal Squadron
Support Squadron
2nd Signal Regiment – Supporting 4th Infantry Brigade and 7th Infantry Brigade at Imphal Barracks (moving to Catterick)
214 Signal Squadron
219 Signal Squadron
Support (Jorvik) Squadron
3rd (United Kingdom) Divisional Signal Regiment supporting 3rd (UK) Division HQ at Picton Barracks, Bulford Camp
202 Signal Squadron
228 Signal Squadron
249 (Gurkha) Signal Squadron
Support Squadron
10th Signal Regiment depth signals support at Basil Hill Barracks, Corsham
 605 (Network Operations) Signal Troop, at Marlborough Lines, Andover
 81 Signal Squadron (Army Reserve)
 225 Signal Squadron, at Thiepval Barracks, Lisburn
 241 Signal Squadron, at Saint George's Barracks, Bicester Garrison
 251 Signal Squadron, at St Omer Barracks, Aldershot Garrison
11th (Royal School of Signals) Signal Regiment, Blandford Camp
13th Signal Regiment, at Blandford Camp
 224 (Cyber Protection Team) Signal Squadron
 233 (Global Communication Networks) Signal Squadron, at Basil Hill Barracks, MoD Corsham
 254 (Specialist Group Information Services) Signal Squadron
 259 (Global Information Services) Signal Squadron – Joint services
 Combat Information Systems (CIS) Trials and Development Unit (CISTDU)
14th Signal Regiment (Electronic Warfare), at MoD Saint Athan, Vale of Glamorgan (EW)
223 Signal Squadron (EW)
640 Signal Troop (Cyber Mission Team)
650 Signal Troop, at RAF Digby – part of the Joint Service Signals Unit (Digby)
226 Signal Squadron (EW)
237 Signal Squadron (EW)
245 Signal Squadron (EW)
15th Signal Regiment, at Blandford Camp (moving to Swinton Barracks)
207 (Jerboa) Signal Squadron
255 (Bahrain) Signal Squadron
Support Squadron
16th Signal Regiment, at Beacon Barracks, Stafford (supporting 12 Armoured Infantry Brigade)
 230 (Malaya) Signal Squadron
 247 (Gurkha) Squadron
 Support Squadron
18th (United Kingdom Special Forces) Signal Regiment, at Stirling Lines, Hereford
Special Boat Service Signal Squadron
264 (Special Air Service) Signal Squadron
267 (Special Reconnaissance Regiment) Signal Squadron
268 (United Kingdom Special Forces) Signal Squadron
63 (United Kingdom Special Forces) Signal Squadron (Army Reserve)
21st Signal Regiment, at Azimghur Barracks, Colerne (supporting the Strike Brigade/1st Armoured Infantry Bde)
215 Signal Squadron
220 Signal Squadron
Support Squadron
22nd Signal Regiment, at Beacon Barracks, Stafford
217 Signal Squadron
222 Signal Squadron
248 (Gurkha) Signal Squadron
252 (Hong Kong) Signal Squadron
Support Squadron
30th Signal Regiment, at Gamecock Barracks, Bramcote – doubles as RHQ, Queen's Gurkha Signals
244 Signal Squadron (Air Support)
250 (Gurkha) Signal Squadron
256 Signal Squadron
258 Signal Squadron
Support Squadron
299 Signal Squadron (Special Communications), at John Howard Barracks, Bletchley
16th Air Assault Brigade Headquarters and 216 (Parachute) Signal Squadron, Colchester
280 Signal Squadron, Blandford Camp, part of 1st NATO Signal Battalion  (formerly 628 Signal Troop)
660 Signal Troop, at Carver Barracks – supports 29 EOD Support Group and Support Unit, reformed in 2021
Joint Service Signal Unit, Cyprus (Ayios Nikolaos Station, Cyprus) (electronic intelligence gathering)
 Regimental Headquarters
 234 Signal Squadron
 840 Signal Squadron RAF
 Engineering Squadron
 Support Squadron
Cyprus Communications Unit (British Forces Cyprus)
Joint Communications Unit (Falkland Islands)
303 Signals Unit RAF
British Forces South Atlantic Islands Radio Communications Unit (Joint Services)
Royal Corps of Signals Pipes and Drums

Army Reserve

The Royal Corps of Signals reserve component was severely reduced after the 2009 Review of Reserve Forces, losing many full regiments, with their respective squadrons mostly reduced to troops.

 Central Volunteer Headquarters, Royal Corps of Signals, at Basil Hill Barracks, Corsham
 254 (Specialist Group Information Services) Signal Squadron
 Royal Corps of Signals Specialist Pool
 Royal Corps of Signals Full Time Reserve Service
 32nd Signal Regiment
 Regimental Headquarters, in Glasgow
 Northern Band of the Royal Corps of Signals, in Nottingham
 2 (City of Dundee & Highland) Signal Squadron, in Dundee
 40 (Northern Irish Horse) Squadron, in Belfast
 51 (Scottish) Signal Squadron, in Edinburgh
 52 (Lowland) Support Squadron, Glasgow
 37th Signal Regiment
 Regimental Headquarters, in Redditch
 33 (Lancashire and Cheshire) Signal Squadron, in Liverpool
 48 (City of Birmingham) Signal Squadron, in Birmingham
 64 (City of Sheffield) Signal Squadron, in Sheffield
 54 (Queen's Own Warwickshire and Worcestershire Yeomanry) Support Squadron, in Redditch
 39th Signal Regiment (The Skinners)
 Regimental Headquarters, in Bristol
 43 (Wessex and City & County of Bristol) Signal Squadron, in Bath
 53 (Wales and Western) Signal Squadron, in Cardiff
 94 (Berkshire Yeomanry) Signal Squadron, in Windsor
 71st (City of London) Yeomanry Signal Regiment
 Regimental Headquarters, in Bexleyheath
 31 (Middlesex Yeomanry and Princess Louises's Kensington) Signal Squadron, in Uxbridge
 36 (Essex Yeomanry) Signal Squadron, in Colchester
 68 (Inns of Court & City Yeomanry) Signal Squadron, in Whipps Cross
 265 (Kent and County of London Yeomanry (Sharpshooters)) Support Squadron, in Bexleyheath

Cadet Forces
The Royal Corps of Signals is the sponsoring Corps for several Army Cadet Force and Combined Cadet Force units, such as in Blandford Forum, home to the Royal School of Signals.

Order of precedence

See also
 CIS Corps (Ireland)
 Bermuda Volunteer Engineers
 97 Signal Squadron (Volunteers)

References

Further reading

External links

 The Royal Corps of Signals official website
 Royal Corps of Signals RSTL
 Royal Signals Museum
 Royal Signals Association
 Royal Signals ACF and CCF
 Royal Engineers Museum – Origins of Army Signals Services
 32 Signal Regiment

 
British administrative corps
Military communications corps
Military units and formations established in 1920
1920 establishments in the United Kingdom